Željeznice Federacije Bosne i Hercegovine (ŽFBiH) is the railway company of the Federation of Bosnia and Herzegovina. It is one of the two rail companies of Bosnia and Herzegovina (the other is the ŽRS, operating in the Republika Srpska). The company operates 608 km of railroad.

Overview

The company, public and owned by the government of the Federation, was founded in 2001 by the fusion of some public enterprises with the company ŽHB (Željeznice Herceg-Bosne). After extensive rehabilitation, more than 85 percent of the network is now classified as D4 in terms of UIC load categories, allowing maximum loads of 22.5 tons per axle, or 8.0 tons per linear meter.

Basic activity:

Public transport of passengers in domestic and international rail traffic, public transport of cargo via domestic and international rail transport and combined transport;  maintenance, reconstruction, modernisation, construction of wagon stock and other equipment necessary for offering of transport services; maintenance, remont, modernisation and development of railway infrastructure; organisation and safety of railway transport.

Organizational chart
Nijaz Puzić (Director General)
Enis Džafić (Executive Director for Economy Affairs)
Muhamed Sahić (Exec. Dir. for Legal Affairs and Human Resources)
Vlado Budimir (Exec. Dir. for Railway Operations)
Mirza Šklajić (Exec. Dir. for Infrastructure)
Mario Kozina (Exec. Dir. for Investments and Development Affairs)

Rolling stock

See also
 Republika Srpska Railways
 Rail transport in Bosnia and Herzegovina
 List of companies of Bosnia and Herzegovina

References

External links
 
ŽFBH official website (in Bosnian, English, French and German)
Rail map of Croatia, Slovenia and Bosnia-Herzegovina

Railway companies of Bosnia and Herzegovina
Government-owned railway companies
Railway companies established in 2001
Government-owned companies of Bosnia and Herzegovina